Self-determination is the right of nations to make their own decisions without interference from others.

Self-determination may also refer to:

 Self-determination theory, a theory of human motivation and personality
 Gender self-determination, the concept that a person's legal sex or gender should be determined by their gender identity
 Vetëvendosje (Albanian for self-determination), a progressive political movement in Kosovo
 Self-ownership Individual sovereignty is the concept of property in one's own person, expressed as the moral or natural right of a person to have bodily integrity and be the exclusive controller of one's own body and life. Through consent of the governed, John Locke interprets self-determination of a nation to be the case, if and only if every person's self-ownership is respected by the government.

See also
 Determination (disambiguation)